Phillip Richard Allen (March 26, 1939 – March 1, 2012) was an American stage, film, and television actor probably best known today for his role as Captain Esteban in Star Trek III: The Search for Spock (1984).

Biography 

Allen studied acting at the Neighborhood Playhouse in New York City where he starred in Edward Albee's play Zoo Story and the Pulitzer Prize winning play That Championship Season, winning best acting awards for both. He was also featured in  The Normal Heart, the controversial award-winning play dealing with the early years of the AIDS crisis.
Allen appeared in feature films including Midway, The Onion Field and Mommie Dearest.
He was best known for his television work, primarily during the 1970s and 1980s; he had recurring roles on The Mary Tyler Moore Show, and The Bad News Bears. Allen's many TV guest appearances include Dark Shadows, The Doctors, The Bob Newhart Show, Happy Days, Kojak, Eight is Enough, The Tony Randall Show, Quincy, M.E., CPO Sharkey, Baretta, Dallas, Matlock, The Fall Guy and Law & Order.

Allen died in 2012 at the age of 72. He is survived by daughter Debbie Morton (Allen), sons Kim Allen and actor Keegan Allen.

Filmography

Films

Television

Stage work 
 Zoo Story (1990) M
 50/60 Vision: Plays and Playwrights That Changed The Theatre (Thirteen Plays in Repertory) (1989–90)
 Rain from Heaven (1987)
 The Normal Heart - Ben Weeks (1985)
 Desert Fire (1983)
 Are You There or Have You Ever Been? (1974)
 That Championship Season - Tom Daley (1973–74)
 Sticks and Bones (1972)
 Quietus (1972)
 Harvey- Dr. Lyman Sanderson (1971)
 Adaptation/Next-Contestant (1969–70)
 Cafe Chino (1965)

References

External links
 
 
 
 
 Phillip R. Allen Filmography, LocateTV
 
 
 Obituary

1939 births
2012 deaths
American male television actors
American male stage actors
Male actors from Pittsburgh
20th-century American male actors
21st-century American male actors
American male film actors